The Sisters of the Holy Spirit and Mary Immaculate (founded as the Sisters of the Holy Ghost) are a Catholic female religious order based in Texas. They are the oldest order of sisters in the state, established in 1893 in San Antonio by Margaret Mary Healy Murphy, who created the group in order to help with her mission of educating African Americans in San Antonio.   The order created the first free, private school for the Black community in that city.

References

External links
 "Sisters", a 2018 radio interview from Raidió Teilifís Éireann's  Documentary on One program in which sisters Jo and Gabrielle Murray from an Irish family, who travelled to the United States during the 1950s to join the order, are interviewed about their experiences and decision to enter religious life

Catholic female orders and societies
African-American Roman Catholicism